The Grob G140TP is a four-seat light aircraft built by Grob Aircraft.

Development
The aircraft was presented at the Paris Air Show in 2001 and completed its maiden flight on December 12, 2002. Powered by a Rolls-Royce 250-B17F turboprop engine, the Grob G 140TP is fully aerobatic capable. So far, Grob Aircraft has not decided to resume construction of the G 140. The coarse G 140TP could have been certified in the utility and aerobatic classes, with the utility version being used as a reconnaissance aircraft.

Specifications (G 140TP)

References

Further reading
 Grob G 115,120 and 140 Information brochure and Technical Datasheet (Grob Aerospace Sales Department, 2004)

2000s German sport aircraft
Grob aircraft
Single-engined tractor aircraft
Low-wing aircraft
Aircraft first flown in 2002